James "Bukom Fire" Armah (born 11 March 1976) is a Ghanaian professional boxer of the 1990s, 2000s and 2010s who won the African Boxing Union featherweight title, Commonwealth lightweight title, and Commonwealth super featherweight title, and was a challenger for the WBO Asia Pacific light welterweight title (twice), WBO Oriental light welterweight title, and WBA Pan African light welterweight title, against Chad Bennett. His professional fighting weight varied from featherweight to light middleweight.

After marrying, he and his wife decided in 2017 to move to Grafton, New South Wales, Australia, where his wife has family. In Grafton, Armah became involved with the local amateur boxing club.

References

External links

Image – James Armah

1976 births
Featherweight boxers
Light-middleweight boxers
Lightweight boxers
Light-welterweight boxers
Living people
African Boxing Union champions
Boxers from Accra
Super-featherweight boxers
Welterweight boxers
Ghanaian male boxers
Ghanaian emigrants to Australia